Homeboy – Original Score Performed by Eric Clapton is a soundtrack album recorded by the British Rock musician Eric Clapton and features a total of eighteen songs which were mostly composed by Clapton especially for the 1988 American sports drama Homeboy starring Mickey Rourke, Christopher Walken and Debra Feuer. The album was produced and supervised by Fraser Kennedy.

Artwork and release
The album cover shows leading actor in the movie Mickey Rourke in a boxing gym wearing his equipment looking directly into the camera. The background behind and aside the photograph is dark blue and has writing concerning the album title, main actors and performers of the soundtrack on it. The Japanese album cover, features a different photograph on the front cover as well as a second picture, showing Clapton alongside Rourke. The soundtrack was originally released under Virgin Records in September 1988 in North America and for the rest of the world – notably Europe – in November later the same year. In 1988 and 1989, the soundtrack album was released on music cassette, compact disc and grammophone record formats by Virgin Records throughout the world and was in 2004 re-released the first time on compact disc format only. In 2009, the soundtrack album was re-released again by Virgin Records as the release was requested by more and more fans around the world.

Reception
As the release history shows, the album gained the highest sales figures in Canada, Italy, Spain, the United Kingdom, the United States and Japan. Although it is unknown if the soundtrack album did reach any national charts, it had sold more than 100,000 copies in Italy and also gained a Gold record in the United States by the Recording Industry Association of America (RIAA), selling more than 500,000 copies in the country and more than 600,000 worldwide. Music journalists form the film website DVD Legion think the release " stands out." and notes that Clapton played emotional Blues as well as Pop and Rock music or the release. AllMusic critic William Ruhlmann awards the soundtrack three out of five possible stars, giving it an average soundtrack album rating, reviewing:

Track listing

Certifications

References

1988 soundtrack albums
Blues soundtracks
Eric Clapton soundtracks
Sports film soundtracks
Pop rock soundtracks
Virgin Records soundtracks
Single-artist film soundtracks